Highway 215 (AR 215, Ark. 215, and Hwy. 215) is a designation for three north–south state highways in northwest Arkansas. A southern route of  runs north from Franklin County Road 31 and Franklin County Road 221 (CR 31/CR 221) at Dahoma to Highway 96 near the Arkansas River. A second route of  begins at US Route 64/Highway 917 (US 64/AR 917) in Mulberry and runs north to CR 77/CR 102 in the Ozark National Forest. A third segment of  begins at Highway 23 at Cass and runs north to Johnson CR 36 at Oark.

Route description

Franklin County
Highway 215 begins at Franklin CR 31/CR 221 west of Peter Pender and runs west to Vesta. The route has a junction with Highway 217 at Vesta before turning due north toward the Arkansas River. Highway 215 terminates at Highway 96 near the Crawford county line.

Mulberry to Ozark National Forest
The route begins in Mulberry at US 64 with the roadway continuing south as Highway 917. Highway 215 runs north through Mulberry past the Bryant-Lasater House on the National Register of Historic Places (NRHP) to a junction with Interstate 40 in north Mulberry. The highway continues north into Franklin County where it curves east around Fern and terminates at Franklin CR 77/CR 102 in the Ozark National Forest.

Cass to Oark
Highway 215 begins at Highway 23 (Pig Trail Scenic Byway) and runs east through the Ozark National Forest. The route enters Johnson County and enters Oark. Highway 215 terminates at Johnson CR 36 near the N.E. Dickerson Store and Oark School-Methodist Church, both listed on the NRHP.

Major intersections

See also

 List of state highways in Arkansas

References

External links

215
Transportation in Franklin County, Arkansas
Transportation in Crawford County, Arkansas
Transportation in Johnson County, Arkansas